Calycophyllum candidissimum, the degami, dagame or lemonwood, is a species of flowering plant in the family Rubiaceae, native to southern Mexico, Cuba, Central America, Colombia, and Venezuela. It is the national tree of Nicaragua.

References

Dialypetalantheae
Flora of Southwestern Mexico
Flora of Central Mexico
Flora of Veracruz
Flora of Southeastern Mexico
Flora of Cuba
Flora of Central America
Flora of Colombia
Flora of Venezuela
Plants described in 1830
Flora without expected TNC conservation status